Rebecca Hay Elliot Walton  (born 1958) is a regional director of the British Council. She was admitted as a Companion of the Order of St Michael and St George for services to UK cultural relations in the 2019 Birthday Honours.

References

1958 births
Companions of the Order of St Michael and St George
Living people